Stemarene is a diterpene hydrocarbon can be produced biosynthetically through enzyme extracts from rice.

References

Diterpenes
Cyclopentanes